DamEttan (called Division 1, 2007–2015) is the second-highest women's ice hockey league in Sweden, below the SDHL and above Damtvåan. Beginning with the first official women's ice hockey Swedish Championship in 1988, the league served as the highest division for women's ice hockey and the winner of its playoffs was named Swedish Champion. During the 2007–08 season, the best Division 1 teams qualified for a newly created premier league, the Riksserien (renamed SDHL in 2016), which made Division 1 the second-tier league. 

The league is split into four geographical divisions: DamEttan Södra (South), DamEttan Norra (North), DamEttan Östra (East), and DamEttan Västra (West). The DamEttan play-offs feature the top teams from each division, competing against each other for a chance to gain promotion to the SDHL. 

Bodycheckings were allowed for the 2022–2023 season.

Current clubs (2019-20)

DamEttan Södra  

 IF Malmö Redhawks
 Karlskrona HK
 IF Troja/Ljungby
 Linköping HC Dam (2nd team)
 Trollhättans HC
  Hvidovre IK
Source:

DamEttan Norra 

 Skellefteå AIK
 MODO Hockey   
 IF Björklöven
 Luleå HF
Source:

DamEttan Östra 

AIK
Almtuna IS
Hammarby IF
 Haninge Anchors HC
 Kallhälls IF
SDE HF
Södertälje SK
Tullinge TP HC
Source:

DamEttan Västra  

Färjestad BK
Leksands IF (2nd team)
 Sandvikens IK
SHK Hockey Club
Hällefors/Filipstad
Västerås IK
Source:

References

External links 
 League statistics and data from the Swedish Ice Hockey Association’s stats site

Sweden
Professional ice hockey leagues in Sweden
Women's ice hockey competitions in Sweden
2007 establishments in Sweden
Sports leagues established in 2007
Women's sports leagues in Sweden